Orgazmo is a 1997 American superhero sex comedy film written, directed and edited by Trey Parker and produced by Matt Stone, Jason McHugh, and Fran Rubel Kuzui. It stars Parker, Stone, Dian Bachar, Robyn Lynne, and Michael Dean Jacobs. The plot follows Joe Young (Parker), a devout Mormon missionary who, to pay for his and his fiancée's dream wedding and home, hesitantly participates in a pornographic film for an abusive director. Orgazmo is Parker and Stone's second film, following 1993's Cannibal! The Musical.

Plot
Mormon missionary Joseph Young, assigned with his mission partner to Los Angeles, finds the city to be a hostile and unenthusiastic place for their work. The problems worsen when they knock on the door of sleazy porn director Maxxx Orbison, and several security guards are sent to dispose of them. Joe defeats all of them singlehandedly with a variety of martial arts skills. Impressed by his performance and bored of his current project's lead actor, Orbison attempts to hire Joe to be the title character and lead of his pornographic superhero film, Orgazmo. Joe is conflicted because of his beliefs because he is a missionary, but the salary offered would pay for a wedding in the temple in Utah where his fiancée Lisa has expressed a strong desire to wed. Joe reluctantly accepts despite being given a sign from God.

Joe finds the crew of the film intimidating but befriends co-star Ben Chapleski, a technical genius and graduate from MIT who works in the pornographic industry to satiate his overactive libido. He plays Orgazmo's sidekick Choda Boy, who assists Orgazmo with specially designed sex toys, including Orgazmo's signature weapon, the Orgazmorator, a ray gun that forces orgasm upon whomever it is fired. Ben invites Joe to his home later on and shows Joe a real, working Orgazmorator Ben has built, and he and Joe spend an evening using it on unsuspecting citizens for amusement.

At a sushi bar owned by Ben's Japanese friend G-Fresh, the two witness a group of thugs vandalizing the bar to force out G-Fresh so their dance club next door can expand. Later on, when Ben and Joe are gone, G-Fresh is coerced to leave after being assaulted by the same thugs. Upon finding this out, Joe and Ben don costumes and use their film props and the Orgazmorator to sneak into the club and steal back the contract G-Fresh was forced to sign. Joe is agitated after nearly being shot in the head, but Ben is excited by being a real superhero.

Orgazmo becomes an amazing success, both financially and critically, and Orbison withholds Joe's paycheck to keep him in town long enough to announce a sequel. Tempted with a doubled salary, Joe is confronted by Lisa, who has found out what he has been doing and leaves him. Facing production difficulties and harassment from Orbison's unsympathetic nephew A-Cup, Joe tries to back out of the project, but Orbison refuses.  When Joe stands up to him, Orbison has Lisa kidnapped. Ben realizes the thugs who assaulted G-Fresh are also working for Orbison, and he joins Joe in storming Orbison's mansion before Lisa can be forced to perform in one of Orbison's films.

Fighting through Orbison's group of henchmen, Joe and Ben meet their match in A-Cup. Joe encourages Ben to unleash his long-repressed Hamster Style discipline of martial arts, allowing Ben to beat A-Cup. After repairing his damaged Orgazmorator, Joe repeatedly shoots Orbison with it, incapacitating him and capturing all the henchmen. Ben blows up the mansion with another device, the "Cock Rocket", destroying Orbison's base of operations. Joe and Lisa reconcile, and she gives him her blessing to remain in Los Angeles and continue being a hero alongside Ben.

A doctor tells Orbison that after so many orgasms in a row, his testicles have swollen to the size of oranges, and surgical removal is the only option. A now insane Orbison declares revenge on Orgazmo and becomes the personification of A-Cup's character, who is immune to the Orgazmorator: Neutered Man.

Cast

 Trey Parker as Joe Young/Orgazmo
 Dian Bachar as Ben Chapleski/Choda Boy
 Robert Lansing as Young Ben
 Robyn Lynne Raab as Lisa
 Michael Dean Jacobs as Maxxx Orbison
 Matt Stone as Dave The Photographer
 Masao Maki as G-Fresh
 Toddy Walters as Georgi
 Ron Jeremy as Clark/Jizzmaster Zero
 David Dunn as A-Cup/Neutered Man
 Chasey Lain as Candi
 Juli Ashton as Saffi
 Shayla LaVeaux as Greek porn actress
 Jill Kelly as Nurse
 Lloyd Kaufman as Doctor
 Max Hardcore as Award show presenter
 Christi Lake
 Jeanna Fine
 Jacklyn Lick
 Mike Eaton as Meatfish
 Melissa Hill
 Serenity

Release
Orgazmo premiered at the Toronto Film Festival in 1997.  The Motion Picture Association of America gave the film an NC-17 rating, resulting in a very limited release in the US. There is an 'Unrated' version that was released on the two-sided DVD set along with the theatrical version; it runs two minutes shorter than the original 94-minute release. The film was released via Blu-ray on May 12, 2015. This includes both versions of the film and all the features from the DVD.

Critical reception
As of September 2022, the review-aggregation website Rotten Tomatoes gave the film a score of 48% and an average rating of 4.90/10 based on 33 reviews. The website's critical consensus read: "More juvenile than provocative, Orgazmo may have enough good-natured raunch to satisfy writer-director Trey Parker's fans, but its satire is too soft to compete with the South Park co-creator's best work." As of September 2020, the film had a score of 48 out of 100 on Metacritic based on 17 critics, indicating "mixed or average reviews". Roger Ebert gave the film half a star out of four, arguing that Orgazmo had little of the clever wit Parker and Stone brought to South Park, and furthermore describing the film as "callow, gauche, obvious and awkward, and designed to appeal to those with similar qualities". On the other hand, James Berardinelli gave the film three out of four stars, calling it "crude, rude, profane, and funny" and saying that it's the kind of movie that makes "for a great event at parties". 

Orgazmo has been deemed a cult film, mostly by fans of South Park, which creators Trey Parker and Matt Stone subsequently released to critical acclaim. Its reception and rating by the MPAA is discussed in the 2006 documentary This Film Is Not Yet Rated.

See also

 Portrayals of Mormons in popular media

References

External links

 

1990s English-language films
1990s parody films
1990s satirical films
1990s sex comedy films
1990s superhero comedy films
1997 comedy films
1997 films
American satirical films
American sex comedy films
American superhero films
Erotic fantasy films
Films about pornography
American independent films
1997 independent films
Films directed by Trey Parker
Films produced by Matt Stone
Films set in Los Angeles
Films with screenplays by Trey Parker
Mormonism in fiction
Rogue (company) films
Works about Mormon missionaries
Works by Trey Parker and Matt Stone
1990s American films